WSYY may refer to:

 WSYY (AM), a radio station (1240 AM) licensed to Millinocket, Maine, United States
 WSYY-FM, a radio station (94.9 FM) licensed to Millinocket, Maine, United States